William Joseph Napier (1857 – 28 November 1925) was a Liberal Party Member of Parliament for City Auckland (1899–1902) in New Zealand.

Early life
Napier was born in Ireland and arrived in New Zealand when he was five years old. He was educated at St Peter's School, Auckland Grammar School and St John's College, Auckland.

Lawyer
Napier was a lawyer. He was called to the bar in New Zealand in 1883, and in Fiji in 1886. In 1889 he became adviser to Mata'afa Iosefo, a ruler in Samoa. He was counsel to Sir George Grey until his death, and to Te Kooti and Rewi Maniapoto. He also acted for Malietoa Tanumafili I, another traditional ruler of Samoa, as well as the Government of Tonga.

Politician

Of seven candidates, he came fifth. In 1901 he was chairman of the statutes revision committee. Napier was a member of the Auckland Harbour Board (1893–1907) and for a time chairman; a founder and president of the Navy League (1893–1907) and the Victoria League in New Zealand and captain for nine years of the Devonport coastguard artillery.

Later life
Napier was elected a fellow of the North British Academy of Arts in 1910. Napier died at a private hospital in Auckland on 28 November 1925, and was survived by his wife and two sons. In 1914 he became the president of the Sunnyside Rugby League Football Club which played on the North Shore of Auckland before they merged with North Shore Albions in 1920. At the 1915 annual general meeting he did not seek re-election. The former New Zealand Prime Minister, Joseph Ward was appointed the club patron.

He is buried at Hillsborough Cemetery.

References

1857 births
1925 deaths
New Zealand Liberal Party MPs
19th-century New Zealand lawyers
People educated at St Peter's College, Auckland
Irish emigrants to New Zealand (before 1923)
Unsuccessful candidates in the 1890 New Zealand general election
Unsuccessful candidates in the 1902 New Zealand general election
Unsuccessful candidates in the 1908 New Zealand general election
Unsuccessful candidates in the 1911 New Zealand general election
Burials at Hillsborough Cemetery, Auckland
People educated at Auckland Grammar School
19th-century New Zealand politicians
Auckland Harbour Board members